Juan Misael Saracho Campero (27 January 1857 – 1 October 1915) was a Bolivian lawyer, journalist and politician who served as the 18th vice president of Bolivia from 1909 to 1915. He first served as second vice president alongside first vice president Macario Pinilla Vargas during the administration of Eliodoro Villazón. Nearing the end of Villazón's term in 1913, he ran for the position of first vice president during the second presidential bid of Ismael Montes. He served as first vice president alongside second vice president José Carrasco Torrico. 

As a Senator for Tarija, he was a member of the convention of 1899 which elected José Manuel Pando to the presidency. He served as Minister of Public Instruction and Justice, Government and Development, and served multiple times as Foreign Minister during the Montes and Villazón administrations.

He was proclaimed the Liberal Party candidate for the presidency in the 1917 general election but died suddenly on 1 October 1915 at age 58.

References 

1857 births
1915 deaths
Foreign ministers of Bolivia
Liberal Party (Bolivia) politicians
Vice presidents of Bolivia